The 2005–06 season was Stoke City's 99th season in the Football League, the 39th in the second tier and second in the Championship.

In June 2005 Tony Pulis was sacked by Stoke's Icelandic board and Dutch manager Johan Boskamp was appointed. He went about changing Stoke's style of play to a more European passing style which also meant a decent number of foreign players were signed by the club. The change in style had mixed success whilst Stoke did play good attacking football the defensive qualities by Pulis's side went missing and Stoke suffered some poor defeats particularly at home. Stoke were far too inconsistent to be anything other than a mid-table side and they finished in 13th position. At the end of the season Boskamp left the club and Icelandic chairman Gunnar Gíslason put the club up for sale. Former chairman Peter Coates brought the club back and re-appointed Tony Pulis as manager.

Season review

League
On 28 June 2005 manager Tony Pulis was sacked by Gunnar Gíslason for "failing to exploit the foreign transfer market". The next day Dutch manager Johan Boskamp was named as Pulis' successor. Boskamp went about changing Stoke's style of play to be more attacking and possession based during pre-season and he brought in a number of foreign players. Most came from the Belgian Pro League and mainly his old club Anderlecht. In came Carl Hoefkens, Hannes Sigurðsson, Junior N'Galula and Martin Kolář whilst Marlon Broomes, Paul Gallagher Mamady Sidibé, Peter Sweeney and Luke Chadwick the domestic based players to join the club.

The first match of the 2005–06 season saw City come up against newly promoted Sheffield Wednesday and Stoke struggled to a goalless draw after Gerry Taggart had been sent-off after just 10 minutes. In the next match Stoke lost 4–2 away at Leicester City to set the defensive tone for the season. The club record fee was broken with the £950,000 signing of Sambégou Bangoura on transfer deadline day but three bad home defeats by Watford, Wolverhampton Wanderers and Cardiff City saw supporters begin to ask questions. Bangoura then went on a good run of form scoring seven goals in six matches as Stoke won six matches in November and December to give them a platform to build on going into the new year. But in one of those wins away at Coventry City Boskamp and his assistant Jan de Koning and director of football John Rudge were involved in an argument which led to Boskamp almost resigning.

Stoke began 2006 in terrible form winning just one match in ten and scoring a mere six goals in that time. Bangoura had been away on international duty with Guinea and failed to return to the club at the agreed date which caused the shortage of goals and with Stoke's season fizzling out with no chance of promotion Boskamp was not offered a new contract by Gunnar Gíslason. Stoke ended the season with an emphatic 5–1 win at relegated Brighton & Hove Albion and young striker Adam Rooney scored a hat-trick becoming Stoke's youngest scorer of a hat-trick.

With the Icelandic board failing to gain promotion to the Premier League and with debts now at around £5million chairman Gunnar Gíslason put the club up for sale and he sold the club back to former chairman Peter Coates. Coates then re-appointed Tony Pulis as manager who had spent the season with Plymouth Argyle.

FA Cup
Stoke had three ties against Birmingham opposition in this seasons FA Cup firstly beating plucky non-league Tamworth on penalties in a replay and then a 2–1 win against Walsall before losing 1–0 to Birmingham City.

League Cup
Stoke continued their poor showing against lower league sides in the first round this time losing 3–0 on penalties to Mansfield Town.

Final league table

Results
Stoke City's score comes first

Legend

Pre-Season Friendlies

Football League Championship

FA Cup

League Cup

Squad statistics

References

Stoke City F.C. seasons
Stoke City